The 9th Infantry Division (Hanja: 第九步兵師團), also known as White Horse Division (hanja:白馬師團) after the victory of Battle of White Horse, is an infantry division of the Republic of Korea Army. The unit is composed of the 28th, 29th and 30th Regiments.

History

Korean War

The 9th Division was hastily created in late 1950 during the Korean War and operated in the mountainous terrain of Seorak and Odae in the northeast, not far from the 38th parallel. The North Korean II Corps cut it off in late 1950 and the Division suffered heavy casualties.

During October 1952, all three 9th Division regiments, the 28th, 29th and 30th (12,000 men) held Hill 395, northwest of Cheorwon, South Korea, known as White Horse Mountain. The Division prepared for a Chinese assault. A captured North Korean officer who knew of the impending attack and did not want to be in the fight betrayed his comrades and told the ROKs about it. Many support units helped the 9th Division, but at the end of the day, it was the 9th Division pitted squarely against the Chinese 38th Army. The 9th Division was renamed after the battle and is known as the White Horse Division.

Three 9th Division men received the US Distinguished Service Cross (DSC) for their service in the Battle of White Horse Mountain, near Chatkol. The DSC is the second highest military decoration of the United States Army, awarded for extreme gallantry and risk of life in combat with an armed enemy force. The ROK recipients were Major General Kim Chon O, 9th Division; 2nd Lt. Chung Nak Koo, 11th Co., 28th Regiment; and Sergeant Kim Man Su, 9th Co., 29th Regiment.

Vietnam War

The 9th Division arrived in Vietnam between 5 September and 8 October 1966 and was positioned in the Ninh Hòa District at the junction of Route 1 and Route 21. The 28th Regiment was stationed in the Tuy Hòa area, the 29th Regiment at the division headquarters at Ninh Hòa Base and the 30th Regiment on the mainland side to protect Cam Ranh Bay. With these three areas under control, the 9th Division could control Route 1 and the population along that main road all the way from Tuy Hoa down to Phan Rang, from Tuy Hòa north to Qui Nhơn, and as far north of that city as the foothills of the mountains in southern Bình Định Province.

Significant operations and actions involving the Division include:

 Operation Ma Doo I, an operation by the 28th Regiment in Phú Yên Province from 21 January to 7 February 1967 results in ROK claims of 160 People's Army of Vietnam (PAVN) killed and 167 weapons captured
 Operation Baek Ma I, a search and destroy operation in Khánh Hòa Province by the 29th and 30th Regiments from 29 to 31 January 1967 results in ROK claims of 390 PAVN killed and 302 weapons captured for no friendly losses
 Operation Oh Jak Kyo, to link up the Division's tactical area of responsibility with the Capital Division in Phú Yên Province from 8 March to 18 April 1967 results in ROK claims of 831 Vietcong (VC) killed and 659 weapons captured for the loss of 23 ROK
 Operation Hong Kil Dong, with the Capital Division in Tuy Hòa Province from 9 July to 21 August 1967, ROK claiming 638 PAVN killed for the loss of 26 ROK. 98 crew-served and 359 individual weapons were captured

Commanders during Vietnam War
Maj. Gen. Yi So-dong

Maj. Gen.Cho Chun-sung

Order of battle during Vietnam War
9th Infantry Division
Armored Company
Direct Control Company
Reconnaissance Company
Engineering Battalion
30th Field Artillery Battalion
51st Field Artillery Battalion
52nd Field Artillery Battalion
966th Field Artillery Battalion
28th Infantry Regiment
29th Infantry Regiment (Commanded by future ROK President Chun Doo-hwan, 1970-71.)
30th Infantry Regiment

Unit statistics for the Vietnam War

Coup d'état of December Twelfth

In 1979, the 9th Division was involved in the Coup d'état of December Twelfth, when its commander, Major General Roh Tae-Woo led the unit to Seoul without orders, away from its normal position near the DMZ, and supported the take-over of the South Korean government by Lt. General Chun Doo Hwan.

See also
Republic of Korea Armed Forces
Republic of Korea Army
Korean War
Battle of White Horse
Vietnam War
Capital Mechanized Infantry Division
2nd Marine Brigade

References

InfDiv0009
InfDiv0009SK
Military units and formations established in 1949
Military units and formations of South Korea in the Vietnam War
South Korea